Sinan County may refer to a county with the same name in China and South Korea:

 Sinan County, Guizhou (思南县), of Tongren Prefecture, Guizhou, China
 Sinan County, South Jeolla (신안군 / 新安郡), in South Jeolla Province, South Korea